In dynamical systems theory, the Bogdanov map is a chaotic 2D map related to the Bogdanov–Takens bifurcation. It is given by the transformation:

The Bogdanov map is named after Rifkat Bogdanov.

See also 
 List of chaotic maps

References

 DK Arrowsmith, CM Place, An introduction to dynamical systems, Cambridge University Press, 1990.
 Arrowsmith, D. K.; Cartwright, J. H. E.; Lansbury, A. N.; and Place, C. M. "The Bogdanov Map: Bifurcations, Mode Locking, and Chaos in a Dissipative System." Int. J. Bifurcation Chaos 3, 803–842, 1993.
 Bogdanov, R. "Bifurcations of a Limit Cycle for a Family of Vector Fields on the Plane." Selecta Math. Soviet 1, 373–388, 1981.

External links
Bogdanov map at MathWorld

Chaotic maps
Exactly solvable models
Dynamical systems